Vukanić is a Serbian name, derived from the male given name Vukan. It may refer to:

 Nenad Vukanić (born 1974), Serbian-Montenegrin water polo player
 Dragan Vukanić,
 Nemanja Vukanić,
 Vukan Vukanić, Serbian painter

See also
Vukanović

Serbian surnames